The Magdalena District is a city district of the City Municipality of Maribor in northeastern Slovenia. In 2014, the district had a population of 6,439. Maribor University Medical Centre is located in the district.

References

Districts of the City Municipality of Maribor